The 1966 United States House of Representatives elections was an election for the United States House of Representatives on November 8, 1966, to elect members to serve in the 90th United States Congress. They occurred in the middle of President Lyndon B. Johnson's second term. As the Vietnam War continued to escalate and race riots exploded in cities across the country, Johnson's popularity had fallen, and the opposition Republican Party was able to gain a net of 47 seats from Johnson's Democratic Party, which nonetheless maintained a clear majority in the House. This was also the first election that occurred after the Voting Rights Act of 1965 became law.

Republican gains
 
 Alaska's at-large congressional district: four-term Democratic incumbent Ralph Julian Rivers was defeated by Republican State Senator Howard Wallace Pollock.
 Arizona's 3rd congressional district: sophomore Democrat George F. Senner Jr. was defeated by state legislator Sam Steiger.
 Arkansas's 3rd congressional district: lumber executive and Arkansas GOP chair John Paul Hammerschmidt defeated incumbent James William Trimble, becoming the first Republican member of Arkansas' congressional delegation since Reconstruction.
 California's 18th congressional district: onetime Olympic gold medalist Robert B. Mathias defeated seven-term Democratic incumbent Harlan Hagen.
 California's 25th congressional district: Charles E. Wiggins defeated incumbent Democrat Ronald B. Cameron.
 California's 33rd congressional district: Jerry L. Pettis defeated incumbent Kenneth W. Dyal.
 Texas's 7th congressional district: businessman and 1964 U.S. Senate candidate George H. W. Bush defeated Democratic challenger Frank Briscoe for the seat vacated by John V. Dowdy (whose district had been renumbered the second).
 Texas's 18th congressional district: Bob Price succeeded retiring Democrat Walter Edward Rogers by defeating Dee Miller.

Special elections 
Elections are listed by date and district.

|-
! 
| Herbert Covington Bonner
|  | Democratic
| 
|  | Incumbent died November 7, 1965.New member elected February 5, 1966.Democratic hold.Successor was later re-elected, see below.
| nowrap | 

|-
! 
| John Lindsay
|  | Republican
| 
|  | Incumbent resigned December 31, 1965 to become Mayor of New York City.New member elected February 8, 1966.Republican hold.Successor was later re-elected, see below.
| nowrap | 

|-
! 
| Albert Thomas
|  | Democratic
| 
|  | Incumbent died February 15, 1966.New member elected March 26, 1966.Democratic hold.Successor did not seek re-election in November, see below.
| nowrap | 

|-
! 
| John F. Baldwin Jr.
|  | Republican
| 
|  | Incumbent died March 9, 1966.New member elected June 7, 1966.Democratic gain.Successor was later re-elected, see below.
| nowrap | 

|}

Overall results

Source: Election Statistics – Office of the Clerk

1 One vacancy due to refusal of House to seat Adam Clayton Powell Jr. (D-New York)

Alabama 

|-
! 
| Jack Edwards
|  | Republican
| 1964
| Incumbent re-elected.
| nowrap | 

|-
! 
| William Louis Dickinson
|  | Republican
| 1964
| Incumbent re-elected.
| nowrap | 

|-
! 
| George W. Andrews
|  | Democratic
| 1944
| Incumbent re-elected.
| nowrap | 

|-
! 
| Glenn Andrews
|  | Republican
| 1964
|  | Incumbent lost re-election.New member elected.Democratic gain.
| nowrap | 

|-
! 
| Armistead I. Selden Jr.
|  | Democratic
| 1952
| Incumbent re-elected.
| nowrap | 

|-
! 
| John Hall Buchanan Jr.
|  | Republican
| 1964
| Incumbent re-elected.
| nowrap | 

|-
! 
| James D. Martin
|  | Republican
| 1964
|  | Incumbent retired to run for Governor of Alabama.New member elected.Democratic gain.
| nowrap | 

|-
! 
| Robert E. Jones Jr.
|  | Democratic
| 1947 
| Incumbent re-elected.
| nowrap | 

|}

Alaska 

|-
! 
| Ralph Julian Rivers
|  | Democratic
| 1958
|  | Incumbent lost re-election.New member elected.Republican gain.
| nowrap | 

|}

Arizona 

|-
! 
| John Jacob Rhodes
|  | Republican
| 1952
| Incumbent re-elected.
| nowrap | 

|-
! 
| Mo Udall
|  | Democratic
| 1961 
| Incumbent re-elected.
| nowrap | 

|-
! 
| George F. Senner Jr.
|  | Democratic
| 1962
|  | Incumbent lost re-election.New member elected.Republican gain.
| nowrap | 

|}

Arkansas 

|-
! 
| Ezekiel C. Gathings
|  | Democratic
| 1938
| Incumbent re-elected.
| nowrap | 

|-
! 
| Wilbur Mills
|  | Democratic
| 1938
| Incumbent re-elected.
| nowrap | 

|-
! 
| James William Trimble
|  | Democratic
| 1944
|  | Incumbent lost re-election.New member elected.Republican gain.
| nowrap | 

|-
! 
| Oren Harris
|  | Democratic
| 1940
|  | Resigned to become District judge.New member elected.Democratic hold.
| nowrap | 

|}

California 

|-
! 
| Donald H. Clausen
|  | Republican
| 1963 
| Incumbent re-elected.
| nowrap | 

|-
! 
| Harold T. Johnson
|  | Democratic
| 1958
| Incumbent re-elected.
| nowrap | 

|-
! 
| John E. Moss
|  | Democratic
| 1952
| Incumbent re-elected.
| nowrap | 

|-
! 
| Robert L. Leggett
|  | Democratic
| 1962
| Incumbent re-elected.
| nowrap | 

|-
! 
| Phillip Burton
|  | Democratic
| 1964
| Incumbent re-elected.
| nowrap | 

|-
! 
| William S. Mailliard
|  | Republican
| 1952
| Incumbent re-elected.
| nowrap | 

|-
! 
| Jeffery Cohelan
|  | Democratic
| 1958
| Incumbent re-elected.
| nowrap | 

|-
! 
| George P. Miller
|  | Democratic
| 1944
| Incumbent re-elected.
| nowrap | 

|-
! 
| Don Edwards
|  | Democratic
| 1962
| Incumbent re-elected.
| nowrap | 

|-
! 
| Charles S. Gubser
|  | Republican
| 1952
| Incumbent re-elected.
| nowrap | 

|-
! 
| J. Arthur Younger
|  | Republican
| 1952
| Incumbent re-elected.
| nowrap | 

|-
! 
| Burt L. Talcott
|  | Republican
| 1962
| Incumbent re-elected.
| nowrap | 

|-
! 
| Charles M. Teague
|  | Republican
| 1954
| Incumbent re-elected.
| nowrap | 

|-
! 
| Jerome Waldie
|  | Democratic
| 1966
| Incumbent re-elected.
| nowrap | 

|-
! 
| John J. McFall
|  | Democratic
| 1956
| Incumbent re-elected.
| nowrap | 

|-
! 
| B. F. Sisk
|  | Democratic
| 1954
| Incumbent re-elected.
| nowrap | 

|-
! 
| Cecil R. King
|  | Democratic
| 1942
| Incumbent re-elected.
| nowrap | 

|-
! 
| Harlan Hagen
|  | Democratic
| 1952
|  | Incumbent lost re-election.New member elected.Republican gain.
| nowrap | 

|-
! 
| Chet Holifield
|  | Democratic
| 1942
| Incumbent re-elected.
| nowrap | 

|-
! 
| H. Allen Smith
|  | Republican
| 1956
| Incumbent re-elected.
| nowrap | 

|-
! 
| Augustus Hawkins
|  | Democratic
| 1962
| Incumbent re-elected.
| nowrap | 

|-
! 
| James C. Corman
|  | Democratic
| 1960
| Incumbent re-elected.
| nowrap | 

|-
! 
| Del M. Clawson
|  | Republican
| 1963 
| Incumbent re-elected.
| nowrap | 

|-
! 
| Glenard P. Lipscomb
|  | Republican
| 1953 
| Incumbent re-elected.
| nowrap | 

|-
! 
| Ronald B. Cameron
|  | Democratic
| 1962
|  | Incumbent lost re-election.New member elected.Republican gain.
| nowrap | 

|-
! 
| Thomas M. Rees
|  | Democratic
| 1965 
| Incumbent re-elected.
| nowrap | 

|-
! 
| Edwin Reinecke
|  | Republican
| 1964
| Incumbent re-elected.
| nowrap | 

|-
! 
| Alphonzo E. Bell Jr.
|  | Republican
| 1960
| Incumbent re-elected.
| nowrap | 

|-
! 
| George Brown Jr.
|  | Democratic
| 1962
| Incumbent re-elected.
| nowrap | 

|-
! 
| Edward R. Roybal
|  | Democratic
| 1962
| Incumbent re-elected.
| nowrap | 

|-
! 
| Charles H. Wilson
|  | Democratic
| 1962
| Incumbent re-elected.
| nowrap | 

|-
! 
| Craig Hosmer
|  | Republican
| 1952
| Incumbent re-elected.
| nowrap | 

|-
! 
| Kenneth W. Dyal
|  | Democratic
| 1964
|  | Incumbent lost re-election.New member elected.Republican gain.
| nowrap | 

|-
! 
| Richard T. Hanna
|  | Democratic
| 1962
| Incumbent re-elected.
| nowrap | 

|-
! 
| James B. Utt
|  | Republican
| 1952
| Incumbent re-elected.
| nowrap | 

|-
! 
| Bob Wilson
|  | Republican
| 1952
| Incumbent re-elected.
| nowrap | 

|-
! 
| Lionel Van Deerlin
|  | Democratic
| 1962
| Incumbent re-elected.
| nowrap | 

|-
! 
| John V. Tunney
|  | Democratic
| 1964
| Incumbent re-elected.
| nowrap | 

|}

Colorado 

|-
! 
| Byron G. Rogers
|  | Democratic
| 1950
| Incumbent re-elected.
| nowrap | 

|-
! 
| Roy H. McVicker
|  | Democratic
| 1964
|  | Incumbent lost re-election.New member elected.Republican gain.
| nowrap | 

|-
! 
| Frank Evans
|  | Democratic
| 1964
| Incumbent re-elected.
| nowrap | 

|-
! 
| Wayne N. Aspinall
|  | Democratic
| 1948
| Incumbent re-elected.
| nowrap | 

|}

Connecticut 

|-
! 
| Emilio Q. Daddario
|  | Democratic
| 1958
| Incumbent re-elected.
| nowrap | 

|-
! 
| William St. Onge
|  | Democratic
| 1962
| Incumbent re-elected.
| nowrap | 

|-
! 
| Robert Giaimo
|  | Democratic
| 1958
| Incumbent re-elected.
| nowrap | 

|-
! 
| Donald J. Irwin
|  | Democratic
| 19581960 1964
| Incumbent re-elected.
| nowrap | 

|-
! 
| John S. Monagan
|  | Democratic
| 1958
| Incumbent re-elected.
| nowrap | 

|-
! 
| Bernard F. Grabowski
|  | Democratic
| 1962
|  | Incumbent lost re-election.New member elected.Republican gain.
| nowrap | 

|}

Delaware 

|-
! 
| Harris McDowell
|  | Democratic
| 1958
|  | Incumbent lost re-election.New member elected.Republican gain.
| nowrap | 

|}

Florida 

Florida redistricted to adjust for demographic changes; in addition to minor boundary changes a district was removed from northern Florida, and Broward County was broken out into its own district.

|-
! 
| Bob Sikes
|  | Democratic
| 19401944 1974
| Incumbent re-elected.
| nowrap | 

|-
! rowspan=2 | 
| Don Fuqua
|  | Democratic
| 1962
| Incumbent re-elected.
| rowspan=2 nowrap | 

|-
| Donald Ray Matthews
|  | Democratic
| 1952
|  | Incumbent lost renomination.Democratic loss.

|-
! 
| Charles E. Bennett
|  | Democratic
| 1948
| Incumbent re-elected.
| nowrap | 

|-
! 
| Syd Herlong
|  | Democratic
| 1948
| Incumbent re-elected.
| nowrap | 

|-
! 
| Edward Gurney
|  | Republican
| 1962
| Incumbent re-elected.
| nowrap | 

|-
! 
| Sam Gibbons
|  | Democratic
| 1962
| Incumbent re-elected.
| nowrap | 

|-
! 
| James A. Haley
|  | Democratic
| 1952
| Incumbent re-elected.
| nowrap | 

|-
! 
| William C. Cramer
|  | Republican
| 1954
| Incumbent re-elected.
| nowrap | 

|-
! 
| Paul Rogers
|  | Democratic
| 1954
| Incumbent re-elected.
| nowrap | 

|-
! 
| colspan=3 | None (District created)
|  | New seat.New member elected.Republican gain.
| nowrap | 

|-
! 
| Claude Pepper
|  | Democratic
| 1962
| Incumbent re-elected.
| nowrap | 

|-
! 
| Dante Fascell
|  | Democratic
| 1954
| Incumbent re-elected.
| nowrap | 

|}

Georgia 

|-
! 
| George Elliott Hagan
|  | Democratic
| 1960
| Incumbent re-elected.
| nowrap | 

|-
! 
| Maston E. O'Neal Jr.
|  | Democratic
| 1964
| Incumbent re-elected.
| nowrap | 

|-
! 
| Bo Callaway
|  | Republican
| 1964
|  | Incumbent retired to run for Governor of Georgia.New member elected.Democratic gain.
| nowrap | 

|-
! 
| James MacKay
|  | Democratic
| 1964
|  | Incumbent lost re-election.New member elected.Republican gain.
| nowrap | 

|-
! 
| Charles L. Weltner
|  | Democratic
| 1962
|  | Incumbent retired.New member elected.Republican gain.
| nowrap | 

|-
! 
| John Flynt
|  | Democratic
| 1954
| Incumbent re-elected.
| nowrap | 

|-
! 
| John William Davis
|  | Democratic
| 1960
| Incumbent re-elected.
| nowrap | 

|-
! 
| J. Russell Tuten
|  | Democratic
| 1962
|  | Incumbent lost renomination.New member elected.Democratic hold.
| nowrap | 

|-
! 
| Phillip M. Landrum
|  | Democratic
| 1952
| Incumbent re-elected.
| nowrap | 

|-
! 
| Robert Grier Stephens Jr.
|  | Democratic
| 1960
| Incumbent re-elected.
| nowrap | 

|}

Hawaii 

|-
! 
| Spark Matsunaga
|  | Democratic
| 1962
| Incumbent re-elected.
| rowspan=2 nowrap | 

|-
! 
| Patsy Mink
|  | Democratic
| 1964
| Incumbent re-elected.

|}

Idaho 

|-
! 
| Compton I. White Jr.
|  | Democratic
| 1962
|  | Incumbent lost re-election.New member elected.Republican gain.
| nowrap | 

|-
! 
| George V. Hansen
|  | Republican
| 1964
| Incumbent re-elected.
| nowrap | 

|}

Illinois 

|-
! 
| William L. Dawson
|  | Democratic
| 1942
| Incumbent re-elected.
| nowrap | 

|-
! 
| Barratt O'Hara
|  | Democratic
| 19481950 1952
| Incumbent re-elected.
| nowrap | 

|-
! 
| William T. Murphy
|  | Democratic
| 1958
| Incumbent re-elected.
| nowrap | 

|-
! 
| Ed Derwinski
|  | Republican
| 1958
| Incumbent re-elected.
| nowrap | 

|-
! 
| John C. Kluczynski
|  | Democratic
| 1950
| Incumbent re-elected.
| nowrap | 

|-
! 
| Daniel J. Ronan
|  | Democratic
| 1964
| Incumbent re-elected.
| nowrap | 

|-
! 
| Frank Annunzio
|  | Democratic
| 1964
| Incumbent re-elected.
| nowrap | 

|-
! 
| Dan Rostenkowski
|  | Democratic
| 1958
| Incumbent re-elected.
| nowrap | 

|-
! 
| Sidney R. Yates
|  | Democratic
| 19481962 1964
| Incumbent re-elected.
| nowrap | 

|-
! 
| Harold R. Collier
|  | Republican
| 1956
| Incumbent re-elected.
| nowrap | 

|-
! 
| Roman Pucinski
|  | Democratic
| 1958
| Incumbent re-elected.
| nowrap | 

|-
! 
| Robert McClory
|  | Republican
| 1962
| Incumbent re-elected.
| nowrap | 

|-
! 
| Donald Rumsfeld
|  | Republican
| 1962
| Incumbent re-elected.
| nowrap | 

|-
! 
| John N. Erlenborn
|  | Republican
| 1964
| Incumbent re-elected.
| nowrap | 

|-
! 
| Charlotte Thompson Reid
|  | Republican
| 1962
| Incumbent re-elected.
| nowrap | 

|-
! 
| John B. Anderson
|  | Republican
| 1960
| Incumbent re-elected.
| nowrap | 

|-
! 
| Leslie C. Arends
|  | Republican
| 1934
| Incumbent re-elected.
| nowrap | 

|-
! 
| Robert H. Michel
|  | Republican
| 1956
| Incumbent re-elected.
| nowrap | 

|-
! 
| Gale Schisler
|  | Democratic
| 1964
|  | Incumbent lost re-election.New member elected.Republican gain.
| nowrap | 

|-
! 
| Paul Findley
|  | Republican
| 1960
| Incumbent re-elected.
| nowrap | 

|-
! 
| Kenneth J. Gray
|  | Democratic
| 1954
| Incumbent re-elected.
| nowrap | 

|-
! 
| William L. Springer
|  | Republican
| 1950
| Incumbent re-elected.
| nowrap | 

|-
! 
| George E. Shipley
|  | Democratic
| 1958
| Incumbent re-elected.
| nowrap | 

|-
! 
| Melvin Price
|  | Democratic
| 1944
| Incumbent re-elected.
| nowrap | 

|}

Indiana 

Indiana redistricted for this election, election boundary changes forced two Republican incumbents into the same district while creating a new district that was won by another Republican.

|-
! 
| Ray Madden
|  | Democratic
| 1942
| Incumbent re-elected.
| nowrap | 

|-
! 
| Charles A. Halleck
|  | Republican
| 1935 
| Incumbent re-elected.
| nowrap | 

|-
! 
| John Brademas
|  | Democratic
| 1958
| Incumbent re-elected.
| nowrap | 

|-
! 
| E. Ross Adair
|  | Republican
| 1950
| Incumbent re-elected.
| nowrap | 

|-
! 
| J. Edward Roush
|  | Democratic
| 1958
| Incumbent re-elected.
| nowrap | 

|-
! 
| William G. Bray
|  | Republican
| 1950
| Incumbent re-elected.
| nowrap | 

|-
! 
| colspan=3 | None (District created)
|  | New seat.New member elected.Republican gain.
| nowrap | 

|-
! 
| Winfield K. Denton
|  | Democratic
| 1954
|  | Incumbent lost re-election.New member elected.Republican gain.
| nowrap | 

|-
! 
| Lee H. Hamilton
|  | Democratic
| 1964
| Incumbent re-elected.
| nowrap | 

|-
! rowspan=2 | 
| Richard L. Roudebush
|  | Republican
| 1960
| Incumbent re-elected.
| rowspan=2 nowrap | 

|-
| Ralph Harvey
|  | Republican
| 1960
|  | Incumbent lost renomination.Republican loss.

|-
! 
| Andrew Jacobs Jr.
|  | Democratic
| 1964
| Incumbent re-elected.
| nowrap | 

|}

Iowa 

|-
! 
| John R. Schmidhauser
|  | Democratic
| 1964
|  | Incumbent lost re-election.New member elected.Republican gain.
| nowrap | 

|-
! 
| John Culver
|  | Democratic
| 1964
| Incumbent re-elected.
| nowrap | 

|-
! 
| H. R. Gross
|  | Republican
| 1948
| Incumbent re-elected.
| nowrap | 

|-
! 
| Bert Bandstra
|  | Democratic
| 1964
|  | Incumbent lost re-election.New member elected.Republican gain.
| nowrap | 

|-
! 
| Neal Edward Smith
|  | Democratic
| 1958
| Incumbent re-elected.
| nowrap | 

|-
! 
| Stanley L. Greigg
|  | Democratic
| 1964
|  | Incumbent lost re-election.New member elected.Republican gain.
| nowrap | 

|-
! 
| John R. Hansen
|  | Democratic
| 1964
|  | Incumbent lost re-election.New member elected.Republican gain.
| nowrap | 

|}

Kansas 

|-
! 
| Bob Dole
|  | Republican
| 1960
| Incumbent re-elected.
| nowrap | 

|-
! 
| Chester L. Mize
|  | Republican
| 1964
| Incumbent re-elected.
| nowrap | 

|-
! 
| Robert Ellsworth
|  | Republican
| 1960
|  | Incumbent retired to run for U.S. senator.New member elected.Republican hold.
| nowrap | 

|-
! 
| Garner E. Shriver
|  | Republican
| 1960
| Incumbent re-elected.
| nowrap | 

|-
! 
| Joe Skubitz
|  | Republican
| 1962
| Incumbent re-elected.
| nowrap | 

|}

Kentucky 

|-
! 
| Frank Stubblefield
|  | Democratic
| 1958
| Incumbent re-elected.
| nowrap | 

|-
! 
| William Natcher
|  | Democratic
| 1953 
| Incumbent re-elected.
| nowrap | 

|-
! 
| Charles R. Farnsley
|  | Democratic
| 1964
|  | Incumbent retired.New member elected.Republican gain.
| nowrap | 

|-
! 
| Frank Chelf
|  | Democratic
| 1944
|  | Incumbent lost re-election.New member elected.Republican gain.
| nowrap | 

|-
! 
| Tim Lee Carter
|  | Republican
| 1964
| Incumbent re-elected.
| nowrap | 

|-
! 
| John C. Watts
|  | Democratic
| 1951 
| Incumbent re-elected.
| nowrap | 

|-
! 
| Carl D. Perkins
|  | Democratic
| 1948
| Incumbent re-elected.
| nowrap | 

|}

Louisiana 

|-
! 
| F. Edward Hébert
|  | Democratic
| 1940
| Incumbent re-elected.
| nowrap | 

|-
! 
| Hale Boggs
|  | Democratic
| 19401942 1946
| Incumbent re-elected.
| nowrap | 

|-
! 
| Edwin E. Willis
|  | Democratic
| 1948
| Incumbent re-elected.
| nowrap | 

|-
! 
| Joe Waggonner
|  | Democratic
| 1961 
| Incumbent re-elected.
| nowrap | 

|-
! 
| Otto Passman
|  | Democratic
| 1946
| Incumbent re-elected.
| nowrap | 

|-
! 
| James H. Morrison
|  | Democratic
| 1942
|  | Incumbent lost renomination.New member elected.Democratic hold.
| nowrap | 

|-
! 
| Edwin Edwards
|  | Democratic
| 1965 
| Incumbent re-elected.
| nowrap | 

|-
! 
| Speedy Long
|  | Democratic
| 1964
| Incumbent re-elected.
| nowrap | 

|}

Maine 

|-
! 
| Stanley R. Tupper
|  | Republican
| 1960
|  | Incumbent retired.New member elected.Democratic gain.
| nowrap | 

|-
! 
| William Hathaway
|  | Democratic
| 1964
| Incumbent re-elected.
| nowrap | 

|}

Maryland 

Maryland redistricted its at-large district into an 8th district around Montgomery County, managing to adjust boundaries so no existing incumbents were displaced.

|-
! 
| Rogers Morton
|  | Republican
| 1962
| Incumbent re-elected.
| nowrap | 

|-
! 
| Clarence Long
|  | Democratic
| 1962
| Incumbent re-elected.
| nowrap | 

|-
! 
| Edward Garmatz
|  | Democratic
| 1947 
| Incumbent re-elected.
| nowrap | 

|-
! 
| George Hyde Fallon
|  | Democratic
| 1944
| Incumbent re-elected.
| nowrap | 

|-
! 
| Hervey Machen
|  | Democratic
| 1964
| Incumbent re-elected.
| nowrap | 

|-
! 
| Charles Mathias
|  | Republican
| 1960
| Incumbent re-elected.
| nowrap | 

|-
! 
| Samuel Friedel
|  | Democratic
| 1952
| Incumbent re-elected.
| nowrap | 

|-
! 
| Carlton R. Sickles
|  | Democratic
| 1962
|  | Incumbent retired to run for Governor of Maryland.New member elected.Republican gain.
| nowrap | 

|}

Massachusetts 

|-
! 
| Silvio O. Conte
|  | Republican
| 1958
| Incumbent re-elected.
| nowrap | 

|-
! 
| Edward Boland
|  | Democratic
| 1952
| Incumbent re-elected.
| nowrap | 

|-
! 
| Philip J. Philbin
|  | Democratic
| 1942
| Incumbent re-elected.
| nowrap | 

|-
! 
| Harold Donohue
|  | Democratic
| 1946
| Incumbent re-elected.
| nowrap | 

|-
! 
| F. Bradford Morse
|  | Republican
| 1960
| Incumbent re-elected.
| nowrap | 

|-
! 
| William H. Bates
|  | Republican
| 1950
| Incumbent re-elected.
| nowrap | 

|-
! 
| Torbert Macdonald
|  | Democratic
| 1954
| Incumbent re-elected.
| nowrap | 

|-
! 
| Tip O'Neill
|  | Democratic
| 1952
| Incumbent re-elected.
| nowrap | 

|-
! 
| John W. McCormack
|  | Democratic
| 1928
| Incumbent re-elected.
| nowrap | 

|-
! 
| Joseph W. Martin Jr.
|  | Republican
| 1924
|  | Incumbent lost renomination.New member elected.Republican hold.
| nowrap | 

|-
! 
| James A. Burke
|  | Democratic
| 1958
| Incumbent re-elected.
| nowrap | 

|-
! 
| Hastings Keith
|  | Republican
| 1958
| Incumbent re-elected.
| nowrap | 

|}

Michigan 

|-
! 
| John Conyers Jr.
|  | Democratic
| 1964
| Incumbent re-elected.
| nowrap | 

|-
! 
| Weston E. Vivian
|  | Democratic
| 1964
|  | Incumbent lost re-election.New member elected.Republican gain.
| nowrap | 

|-
! 
| Paul H. Todd Jr.
|  | Democratic
| 1964
|  | Incumbent lost re-election.New member elected.Republican gain.
| nowrap | 

|-
! 
| J. Edward Hutchinson
|  | Republican
| 1962
| Incumbent re-elected.
| nowrap | 

|-
! 
| Gerald Ford
|  | Republican
| 1948
| Incumbent re-elected.
| nowrap | 

|-
! 
| Charles E. Chamberlain
|  | Republican
| 1956
| Incumbent re-elected.
| nowrap | 

|-
! 
| John C. Mackie
|  | Democratic
| 1964
|  | Incumbent lost re-election.New member elected.Republican gain.
| nowrap | 

|-
! 
| R. James Harvey
|  | Republican
| 1960
| Incumbent re-elected.
| nowrap | 

|-
! 
| Robert P. Griffin
|  | Republican
| 1956
|  | Resigned to become U.S. senator.New member elected.Republican hold.
| nowrap | 

|-
! 
| Elford Albin Cederberg
|  | Republican
| 1952
| Incumbent re-elected.
| nowrap | 

|-
! 
| Raymond F. Clevenger
|  | Democratic
| 1964
|  | Incumbent lost re-election.New member elected.Republican gain.
| nowrap | 

|-
! 
| James G. O'Hara
|  | Democratic
| 1958
| Incumbent re-elected.
| nowrap | 

|-
! 
| Charles Diggs
|  | Democratic
| 1954
| Incumbent re-elected.
| nowrap | 

|-
! 
| Lucien Nedzi
|  | Democratic
| 1961 
| Incumbent re-elected.
| nowrap | 

|-
! 
| William D. Ford
|  | Democratic
| 1964
| Incumbent re-elected.
| nowrap | 

|-
! 
| John D. Dingell Jr.
|  | Democratic
| 1955 
| Incumbent re-elected.
| nowrap | 

|-
! 
| Martha W. Griffiths
|  | Democratic
| 1954
| Incumbent re-elected.
| nowrap | 

|-
! 
| William Broomfield
|  | Republican
| 1956
| Incumbent re-elected.
| nowrap | 

|-
! 
| Billie S. Farnum
|  | Democratic
| 1964
|  | Incumbent lost re-election.New member elected.Republican gain.
| nowrap | 

|}

Minnesota 

|-
! 
| Al Quie
|  | Republican
| 1958
| Incumbent re-elected.
| nowrap | 

|-
! 
| Ancher Nelsen
|  | Republican
| 1958
| Incumbent re-elected.
| nowrap | 

|-
! 
| Clark MacGregor
|  | Republican
| 1960
| Incumbent re-elected.
| nowrap | 

|-
! 
| Joseph Karth
|  | Democratic
| 1958
| Incumbent re-elected.
| nowrap | 

|-
! 
| Donald M. Fraser
|  | Democratic
| 1962
| Incumbent re-elected.
| nowrap | 

|-
! 
| Alec G. Olson
|  | Democratic
| 1962
|  | Incumbent lost re-election.New member elected.Republican gain.
| nowrap | 

|-
! 
| Odin Langen
|  | Republican
| 1958
| Incumbent re-elected.
| nowrap | 

|-
! 
| John Blatnik
|  | Democratic
| 1946
| Incumbent re-elected.
| nowrap | 

|}

Mississippi 

|-
! 
| Thomas Abernethy
|  | Democratic
| 1942
| Incumbent re-elected.
| nowrap | 

|-
! 
| Jamie Whitten
|  | Democratic
| 1941 
| Incumbent re-elected.
| nowrap | 

|-
! 
| John Bell Williams
|  | Democratic
| 1946
| Incumbent re-elected.
| nowrap | 

|-
! 
| Prentiss Walker
|  | Republican
| 1964
|  | Incumbent retired to run for U.S. Senator.New member elected.Democratic gain.
| nowrap | 

|-
! 
| William M. Colmer
|  | Democratic
| 1932
| Incumbent re-elected.
| nowrap | 

|}

Missouri 

|-
! 
| Frank M. Karsten
|  | Democratic
| 1946
| Incumbent re-elected.
| nowrap | 

|-
! 
| Thomas B. Curtis
|  | Republican
| 1950
| Incumbent re-elected.
| nowrap | 

|-
! 
| Leonor Sullivan
|  | Democratic
| 1952
| Incumbent re-elected.
| nowrap | 

|-
! 
| William J. Randall
|  | Democratic
| 1959 
| Incumbent re-elected.
| nowrap | 

|-
! 
| Richard Walker Bolling
|  | Democratic
| 1948
| Incumbent re-elected.
| nowrap | 

|-
! 
| William Raleigh Hull Jr.
|  | Democratic
| 1954
| Incumbent re-elected.
| nowrap | 

|-
! 
| Durward Gorham Hall
|  | Republican
| 1960
| Incumbent re-elected.
| nowrap | 

|-
! 
| Richard Howard Ichord Jr.
|  | Democratic
| 1960
| Incumbent re-elected.
| nowrap | 

|-
! 
| William L. Hungate
|  | Democratic
| 1964
| Incumbent re-elected.
| nowrap | 

|-
! 
| Paul C. Jones
|  | Democratic
| 1948
| Incumbent re-elected.
| nowrap | 

|}

Montana 

|-
! 
| Arnold Olsen
|  | Democratic
| 1960
| Incumbent re-elected.
| nowrap | 

|-
! 
| James F. Battin
|  | Republican
| 1960
| Incumbent re-elected.
| nowrap | 

|}

Nebraska 

|-
! 
| Clair Armstrong Callan
|  | Democratic
| 1964
|  | Incumbent lost re-election.New member elected.Republican gain.
| nowrap | 

|-
! 
| Glenn Cunningham
|  | Republican
| 1956
| Incumbent re-elected.
| nowrap | 

|-
! 
| David Martin
|  | Republican
| 1960
| Incumbent re-elected.
| nowrap | 

|}

Nevada 

|-
! 
| Walter S. Baring Jr.
|  | Democratic
| 19481952 1956
| Incumbent re-elected.
| nowrap | 

|}

New Hampshire 

|-
! 
| Joseph Oliva Huot
|  | Democratic
| 1964
|  | Incumbent lost re-election.New member elected.Republican gain.
| nowrap | 

|-
! 
| James Colgate Cleveland
|  | Republican
| 1962
| Incumbent re-elected.
| nowrap | 

|}

New Jersey 

|-
! 
| colspan=3 | None (District created)
|  | New seat.New member elected.Republican gain.
| nowrap | 

|-
! 
| Thomas C. McGrath Jr.
|  | Democratic
| 1964
|  | Incumbent lost re-election.New member elected.Republican gain.
| nowrap | 

|-
! 
| James J. Howard
|  | Democratic
| 1964
| Incumbent re-elected.
| nowrap | 

|-
! 
| Frank Thompson
|  | Democratic
| 1954
| Incumbent re-elected.
| nowrap | 

|-
! 
| Peter Frelinghuysen Jr.
|  | Republican
| 1952
| Incumbent re-elected.
| nowrap | 

|-
! 
| William T. Cahill
|  | Republican
| 1958
| Incumbent re-elected.
| nowrap | 

|-
! 
| William B. Widnall
|  | Republican
| 1950
| Incumbent re-elected.
| nowrap | 

|-
! 
| Charles Samuel Joelson
|  | Democratic
| 1960
| Incumbent re-elected.
| nowrap | 

|-
! 
| Henry Helstoski
|  | Democratic
| 1964
| Incumbent re-elected.
| nowrap | 

|-
! 
| Peter W. Rodino
|  | Democratic
| 1948
| Incumbent re-elected.
| nowrap | 

|-
! 
| Joseph Minish
|  | Democratic
| 1962
| Incumbent re-elected.
| nowrap | 

|-
! rowspan=2 | 
| Florence P. Dwyer
|  | Republican
| 1956
| Incumbent re-elected.
| rowspan=2 nowrap | 

|-
| Paul J. Krebs
|  | Democratic
| 1964
|  | Incumbent retired.Democratic loss.

|-
! 
| Cornelius Gallagher
|  | Democratic
| 1958
| Incumbent re-elected.
| nowrap | 

|-
! 
| Dominick V. Daniels
|  | Democratic
| 1958
| Incumbent re-elected.
| nowrap | 

|-
! 
| Edward J. Patten
|  | Democratic
| 1962
| Incumbent re-elected.
| nowrap | 

|}

New Mexico 

|-
! 
| Thomas G. Morris
|  | Democratic
| 1958
| Incumbent re-elected.
| rowspan=2 nowrap | 

|-
! 
| E. S. Johnny Walker
|  | Democratic
| 1964
| Incumbent re-elected.

|}

New York 

|-
! 
| Otis G. Pike
|  | Democratic
| 1960
| Incumbent re-elected.
| nowrap | 

|-
! 
| James R. Grover Jr.
|  | Republican
| 1962
| Incumbent re-elected.
| nowrap | 

|-
! 
| Lester L. Wolff
|  | Democratic
| 1964
| Incumbent re-elected.
| nowrap | 

|-
! 
| John W. Wydler
|  | Republican
| 1962
| Incumbent re-elected.
| nowrap | 

|-
! 
| Herbert Tenzer
|  | Democratic
| 1964
| Incumbent re-elected.
| nowrap | 

|-
! 
| Seymour Halpern
|  | Republican
| 1958
| Incumbent re-elected.
| nowrap | 

|-
! 
| Joseph P. Addabbo
|  | Democratic
| 1960
| Incumbent re-elected.
| nowrap | 

|-
! 
| Benjamin Stanley Rosenthal
|  | Democratic
| 1962
| Incumbent re-elected.
| nowrap | 

|-
! 
| James J. Delaney
|  | Democratic
| 19441946 1948
| Incumbent re-elected.
| nowrap | 

|-
! 
| Emanuel Celler
|  | Democratic
| 1922
| Incumbent re-elected.
| nowrap | 

|-
! 
| Eugene James Keogh
|  | Democratic
| 1936
|  | Incumbent retired.New member elected.Democratic hold.
| nowrap | 

|-
! 
| Edna F. Kelly
|  | Democratic
| 1949 
| Incumbent re-elected.
| nowrap | 

|-
! 
| Abraham J. Multer
|  | Democratic
| 1947 
| Incumbent re-elected.
| nowrap | 

|-
! 
| John J. Rooney
|  | Democratic
| 1944
| Incumbent re-elected.
| nowrap | 

|-
! 
| Hugh Carey
|  | Democratic
| 1960
| Incumbent re-elected.
| nowrap | 

|-
! 
| John M. Murphy
|  | Democratic
| 1962
| Incumbent re-elected.
| nowrap | 

|-
! 
| Theodore R. Kupferman
|  | Republican
| 1966
| Incumbent re-elected.
| nowrap | 

|-
! 
| Adam Clayton Powell Jr.
|  | Democratic
| 1944
| Incumbent re-elected.
| nowrap | 

|-
! 
| Leonard Farbstein
|  | Democratic
| 1956
| Incumbent re-elected.
| nowrap | 

|-
! 
| William Fitts Ryan
|  | Democratic
| 1960
| Incumbent re-elected.
| nowrap | 

|-
! 
| James H. Scheuer
|  | Democratic
| 1964
| Incumbent re-elected.
| nowrap | 

|-
! 
| Jacob H. Gilbert
|  | Democratic
| 1960
| Incumbent re-elected.
| nowrap | 

|-
! 
| Jonathan Brewster Bingham
|  | Democratic
| 1964
| Incumbent re-elected.
| nowrap | 

|-
! 
| Paul A. Fino
|  | Republican
| 1952
| Incumbent re-elected.
| nowrap | 

|-
! 
| Richard Ottinger
|  | Democratic
| 1964
| Incumbent re-elected.
| nowrap | 

|-
! 
| Ogden R. Reid
|  | Republican
| 1962
| Incumbent re-elected.
| nowrap | 

|-
! 
| John G. Dow
|  | Democratic
| 1964
| Incumbent re-elected.
| nowrap | 

|-
! 
| Joseph Y. Resnick
|  | Democratic
| 1964
| Incumbent re-elected.
| nowrap | 

|-
! 
| Leo W. O'Brien
|  | Democratic
| 1952
|  | Incumbent retired.New member elected.Republican gain.
| nowrap | 

|-
! 
| Carleton J. King
|  | Republican
| 1960
| Incumbent re-elected.
| nowrap | 

|-
! 
| Robert C. McEwen
|  | Republican
| 1964
| Incumbent re-elected.
| nowrap | 

|-
! 
| Alexander Pirnie
|  | Republican
| 1958
| Incumbent re-elected.
| nowrap | 

|-
! 
| Howard W. Robison
|  | Republican
| 1958
| Incumbent re-elected.
| nowrap | 

|-
! 
| James M. Hanley
|  | Democratic
| 1964
| Incumbent re-elected.
| nowrap | 

|-
! 
| Samuel S. Stratton
|  | Democratic
| 1958
| Incumbent re-elected.
| nowrap | 

|-
! 
| Frank Horton
|  | Republican
| 1962
| Incumbent re-elected.
| nowrap | 

|-
! 
| Barber Conable
|  | Republican
| 1964
| Incumbent re-elected.
| nowrap | 

|-
! 
| Charles Goodell
|  | Republican
| 1959 
| Incumbent re-elected.
| nowrap | 

|-
! 
| Richard D. McCarthy
|  | Democratic
| 1964
| Incumbent re-elected.
| nowrap | 

|-
! 
| Henry P. Smith III
|  | Republican
| 1964
| Incumbent re-elected.
| nowrap | 

|-
! 
| Thaddeus J. Dulski
|  | Democratic
| 1958
| Incumbent re-elected.
| nowrap | 

|}

North Carolina 

|-
! 
| Walter B. Jones Sr.
|  | Democratic
| 1966
| Incumbent re-elected.
| nowrap | 

|-
! 
| Lawrence H. Fountain
|  | Democratic
| 1952
| Incumbent re-elected.
| nowrap | 

|-
! 
| David N. Henderson
|  | Democratic
| 1960
| Incumbent re-elected.
| nowrap | 

|-
! 
| Harold D. Cooley
|  | Democratic
| 1934
|  | Incumbent lost re-election.New member elected.Republican gain.
| nowrap | 

|-
! 
| Ralph James Scott
|  | Democratic
| 1956
|  | Incumbent retired.New member elected.Democratic hold.
| nowrap | 

|-
! 
| Horace R. Kornegay
|  | Democratic
| 1960
| Incumbent re-elected.
| nowrap | 

|-
! 
| Alton Lennon
|  | Democratic
| 1956
| Incumbent re-elected.
| nowrap | 

|-
! 
| Charles R. Jonas
|  | Republican
| 1952
| Incumbent re-elected.
| nowrap | 

|-
! 
| Jim Broyhill
|  | Republican
| 1962
| Incumbent re-elected.
| nowrap | 

|-
! 
| Basil Lee Whitener
|  | Democratic
| 1956
| Incumbent re-elected.
| nowrap | 

|-
! 
| Roy A. Taylor
|  | Democratic
| 1960
| Incumbent re-elected.
| nowrap | 

|}

North Dakota 

|-
! 
| Mark Andrews
|  | Republican
| 1963 
| Incumbent re-elected.
| nowrap | 

|-
! 
| Rolland W. Redlin
|  | Democratic
| 1964
|  | Incumbent lost re-election.New member elected.Republican gain.
| nowrap | 

|}

Ohio 

Ohio redistricted its at-large seat into a 24th district, splitting out the counties to the southwest of Dayton from the city itself, as well as moving a district in southeastern Ohio into the Columbus area.

|-
! 
| John J. Gilligan
|  | Democratic
| 1964
|  | Incumbent lost re-election.New member elected.Republican gain.
| nowrap | 

|-
! 
| Donald D. Clancy
|  | Republican
| 1960
| Incumbent re-elected.
| nowrap | 

|-
! 
| Rodney M. Love
|  | Democratic
| 1964
|  | Incumbent lost re-election.New member elected.Republican gain.
| nowrap | 

|-
! 
| William Moore McCulloch
|  | Republican
| 1947 
| Incumbent re-elected.
| nowrap | 

|-
! 
| Del Latta
|  | Republican
| 1958
| Incumbent re-elected.
| nowrap | 

|-
! 
| Bill Harsha
|  | Republican
| 1960
| Incumbent re-elected.
| nowrap | 

|-
! 
| Bud Brown
|  | Republican
| 1965
| Incumbent re-elected.
| nowrap | 

|-
! 
| Jackson Edward Betts
|  | Republican
| 1950
| Incumbent re-elected.
| nowrap | 

|-
! 
| Thomas L. Ashley
|  | Democratic
| 1954
| Incumbent re-elected.
| nowrap | 

|-
! 
| Walter H. Moeller
|  | Democratic
| 1964
|  | Incumbent lost re-election.New member elected.Republican gain.
| nowrap | 

|-
! 
| J. William Stanton
|  | Republican
| 1964
| Incumbent re-elected.
| nowrap | 

|-
! 
| Samuel L. Devine
|  | Republican
| 1958
| Incumbent re-elected.
| nowrap | 

|-
! 
| Charles Adams Mosher
|  | Republican
| 1960
| Incumbent re-elected.
| nowrap | 

|-
! 
| William Hanes Ayres
|  | Republican
| 1950
| Incumbent re-elected.
| nowrap | 

|-
! 
| colspan=3 | None (District created)
|  | New seat.New member elected.Republican gain.
| nowrap | 

|-
! 
| Frank T. Bow
|  | Republican
| 1950
| Incumbent re-elected.
| nowrap | 

|-
! rowspan=2 | 
| John M. Ashbrook
|  | Republican
| 1960
| Incumbent re-elected.
| rowspan=2 nowrap | 

|-
| Robert T. Secrest
|  | Democratic
| 1962
|  | Incumbent lost re-election.Democratic loss.

|-
! 
| Wayne Hays
|  | Democratic
| 1948
| Incumbent re-elected.
| nowrap | 

|-
! 
| Michael J. Kirwan
|  | Democratic
| 1936
| Incumbent re-elected.
| nowrap | 

|-
! 
| Michael A. Feighan
|  | Democratic
| 1942
| Incumbent re-elected.
| nowrap | 

|-
! 
| Charles Vanik
|  | Democratic
| 1954
| Incumbent re-elected.
| nowrap | 

|-
! 
| Frances P. Bolton
|  | Republican
| 1940
| Incumbent re-elected.
| nowrap | 

|-
! 
| William Edwin Minshall Jr.
|  | Republican
| 1954
| Incumbent re-elected.
| nowrap | 

|-
! 
| Robert E. Sweeney
|  | Democratic
| 1964
|  | Incumbent retired.New member elected.Republican gain.
| nowrap | 

|}

Oklahoma 

|-
! 
| Page Belcher
|  | Republican
| 1950
| Incumbent re-elected.
| nowrap | 

|-
! 
| Ed Edmondson
|  | Democratic
| 1952
| Incumbent re-elected.
| nowrap | 

|-
! 
| Carl Albert
|  | Democratic
| 1946
| Incumbent re-elected.
| nowrap | 

|-
! 
| Tom Steed
|  | Democratic
| 1948
| Incumbent re-elected.
| nowrap | 

|-
! 
| John Jarman
|  | Democratic
| 1950
| Incumbent re-elected.
| nowrap | 

|-
! 
| Jed Johnson Jr.
|  | Democratic
| 1964
|  | Incumbent lost re-election.New member elected.Republican gain.
| nowrap | 

|}

Oregon 

|-
! 
| Wendell Wyatt
|  | Republican
| 1964
| Incumbent re-elected.
| nowrap | 

|-
! 
| Al Ullman
|  | Democratic
| 1956
| Incumbent re-elected.
| nowrap | 

|-
! 
| Edith Green
|  | Democratic
| 1954
| Incumbent re-elected.
| nowrap | 

|-
! 
| Robert B. Duncan
|  | Democratic
| 1962
|  | Incumbent retired to run for U.S. Senator.New member elected.Republican gain.
| nowrap | 

|}

Pennsylvania 

|-
! 
| William A. Barrett
|  | Democratic
| 19441946 1948
| Incumbent re-elected.
| nowrap | 

|-
! 
| Robert N. C. Nix Sr.
|  | Democratic
| 1958
| Incumbent re-elected.
| nowrap | 

|-
! 
| James A. Byrne
|  | Democratic
| 1952
| Incumbent re-elected.
| nowrap | 

|-
! 
| Herman Toll
|  | Democratic
| 1958
|  | Incumbent retired.New member elected.Democratic hold.
| nowrap | 

|-
! 
| William J. Green III
|  | Democratic
| 1964
| Incumbent re-elected.
| nowrap | 

|-
! 
| George M. Rhodes
|  | Democratic
| 1948
| Incumbent re-elected.
| nowrap | 

|-
! 
| colspan=3 | None (District created)
|  | New seat.New member elected.Republican gain.
| nowrap | 

|-
! 
| Willard S. Curtin
|  | Republican
| 1956
|  | Incumbent retired.New member elected.Republican hold.
| nowrap | 

|-
! rowspan=2 | 
| George Watkins
|  | Republican
| 1964
| Incumbent re-elected.
| rowspan=2 nowrap | 

|-
| Paul B. Dague
|  | Republican
| 1946
|  | Incumbent retired.Republican loss.

|-
! 
| Joseph M. McDade
|  | Republican
| 1962
| Incumbent re-elected.
| nowrap | 

|-
! 
| Dan Flood
|  | Democratic
| 19441946 19481952 1954
| Incumbent re-elected.
| nowrap | 

|-
! 
| J. Irving Whalley
|  | Republican
| 1960
| Incumbent re-elected.
| nowrap | 

|-
! 
| Richard Schweiker
|  | Republican
| 1960
| Incumbent re-elected.
| nowrap | 

|-
! 
| William S. Moorhead
|  | Democratic
| 1958
| Incumbent re-elected.
| nowrap | 

|-
! 
| Fred B. Rooney
|  | Democratic
| 1963 
| Incumbent re-elected.
| nowrap | 

|-
! 
| John C. Kunkel
|  | Republican
| 1961 
|  | Incumbent retired.New member elected.Republican hold.
| nowrap | 

|-
! 
| Herman T. Schneebeli
|  | Republican
| 1960
| Incumbent re-elected.
| nowrap | 

|-
! 
| Robert J. Corbett
|  | Republican
| 19381940 1944
| Incumbent re-elected.
| nowrap | 

|-
! 
| Nathaniel N. Craley Jr.
|  | Democratic
| 1964
|  | Incumbent lost re-election.New member elected.Republican gain.
| nowrap | 

|-
! 
| Elmer J. Holland
|  | Democratic
| 1942 1942 1956 
| Incumbent re-elected.
| nowrap | 

|-
! 
| John Herman Dent
|  | Democratic
| 1958
| Incumbent re-elected.
| nowrap | 

|-
! 
| John P. Saylor
|  | Republican
| 1949 
| Incumbent re-elected.
| nowrap | 

|-
! 
| Albert W. Johnson
|  | Republican
| 1963 
| Incumbent re-elected.
| nowrap | 

|-
! 
| Joseph P. Vigorito
|  | Democratic
| 1964
| Incumbent re-elected.
| nowrap | 

|-
! 
| Frank M. Clark
|  | Democratic
| 1954
| Incumbent re-elected.
| nowrap | 

|-
! 
| Thomas E. Morgan
|  | Democratic
| 1944
| Incumbent re-elected.
| nowrap | 

|-
! 
| James G. Fulton
|  | Republican
| 1944
| Incumbent re-elected.
| nowrap | 

|}

Rhode Island 

|-
! 
| Fernand St. Germain
|  | Democratic
| 1960
| Incumbent re-elected.
| nowrap | 

|-
! 
| John E. Fogarty
|  | Democratic
| 1940
| Incumbent re-elected.
| nowrap | 

|}

South Carolina 

|-
! 
| L. Mendel Rivers
|  | Democratic
| 1940
| Incumbent re-elected.
| nowrap | 

|-
! 
| Albert Watson
|  | Republican
| 1962
| Incumbent re-elected.
| nowrap | 

|-
! 
| William Jennings Bryan Dorn
|  | Democratic
| 19461948 1950
| Incumbent re-elected.
| nowrap | 

|-
! 
| Robert T. Ashmore
|  | Democratic
| 1953 
| Incumbent re-elected.
| nowrap | 

|-
! 
| Thomas S. Gettys
|  | Democratic
| 1964
| Incumbent re-elected.
| nowrap | 

|-
! 
| John L. McMillan
|  | Democratic
| 1938
| Incumbent re-elected.
| nowrap | 

|}

South Dakota 

|-
! 
| Ben Reifel
|  | Republican
| 1960
| Incumbent re-elected.
| nowrap | 

|-
! 
| Ellis Yarnal Berry
|  | Republican
| 1950
| Incumbent re-elected.
| nowrap | 

|}

Tennessee 

|-
! 
| Jimmy Quillen
|  | Republican
| 1962
| Incumbent re-elected.
| nowrap | 

|-
! 
| John Duncan Sr.
|  | Republican
| 1964
| Incumbent re-elected.
| nowrap | 

|-
! 
| Bill Brock
|  | Republican
| 1962
| Incumbent re-elected.
| nowrap | 

|-
! 
| Joe L. Evins
|  | Democratic
| 1946
| Incumbent re-elected.
| nowrap | 

|-
! 
| Richard Fulton
|  | Democratic
| 1962
| Incumbent re-elected.
| nowrap | 

|-
! 
| William Anderson
|  | Democratic
| 1964
| Incumbent re-elected.
| nowrap | 

|-
! 
| Tom J. Murray
|  | Democratic
| 1942
|  | Incumbent lost renomination.New member elected.Democratic hold.
| nowrap | 

|-
! 
| Fats Everett
|  | Democratic
| 1958
| Incumbent re-elected.
| nowrap | 

|-
! 
| George W. Grider
|  | Democratic
| 1964
|  | Incumbent lost re-election.New member elected.Republican gain.
| nowrap | 

|}

Texas 

Texas redistricted for this election, eliminating its at-large district and removing two East Texas districts in favor of adding three districts in South Texas, suburban Houston, and suburban Dallas.

|-
! 
| Wright Patman
|  | Democratic
| 1928
| Incumbent re-elected.
| nowrap | 

|-
! 
| John Dowdy
|  | Democratic
| 1952
| Incumbent re-elected.
| nowrap | 

|-
! 
| Joe R. Pool
|  | Democratic
| 1962
| Incumbent re-elected.
| nowrap | 

|-
! rowspan=2 | 
| Ray Roberts
|  | Democratic
| 1962
| Incumbent re-elected.
| rowspan=2 nowrap | 

|-
| Lindley Beckworth
|  | Democratic
| 1956
|  | Incumbent lost renomination.Democratic loss.

|-
! 
| Earle Cabell
|  | Democratic
| 1964
| Incumbent re-elected.
| nowrap | 

|-
! 
| Olin E. Teague
|  | Democratic
| 1946
| Incumbent re-elected.
| nowrap | 

|-
! 
| colspan=3 | None (District created)
|  | New seat.New member elected.Republican gain.
| nowrap | 

|-
! 
| Lera Millard Thomas
|  | Democratic
| 1966
|  | Incumbent retired.New member elected.Democratic hold.
| nowrap | 

|-
! rowspan=2 | 
| Jack Brooks
|  | Democratic
| 1952
| Incumbent re-elected.
| rowspan=2 nowrap | 

|-
| Clark W. Thompson
|  | Democratic
| 1947 
|  | Incumbent retired.Democratic loss.

|-
! 
| J. J. Pickle
|  | Democratic
| 1963 
| Incumbent re-elected.
| nowrap | 

|-
! 
| William R. Poage
|  | Democratic
| 1936
| Incumbent re-elected.
| nowrap | 

|-
! 
| Jim Wright
|  | Democratic
| 1954
| Incumbent re-elected.
| nowrap | 

|-
! 
| Graham B. Purcell Jr.
|  | Democratic
| 1962
| Incumbent re-elected.
| nowrap | 

|-
! 
| John Andrew Young
|  | Democratic
| 1956
| Incumbent re-elected.
| nowrap | 

|-
! 
| Kika de la Garza
|  | Democratic
| 1964
| Incumbent re-elected.
| nowrap | 

|-
! 
| Richard Crawford White
|  | Democratic
| 1964
| Incumbent re-elected.
| nowrap | 

|-
! 
| Omar Burleson
|  | Democratic
| 1946
| Incumbent re-elected.
| nowrap | 

|-
! 
| Walter E. Rogers
|  | Democratic
| 1950
|  | Incumbent retired.New member elected.Republican gain.
| nowrap | 

|-
! 
| George H. Mahon
|  | Democratic
| 1934
| Incumbent re-elected.
| nowrap | 

|-
! 
| Henry B. González
|  | Democratic
| 1961 
| Incumbent re-elected.
| nowrap | 

|-
! 
| O. C. Fisher
|  | Democratic
| 1942
| Incumbent re-elected.
| nowrap | 

|-
! 
| Robert R. Casey
|  | Democratic
| 1958
| Incumbent re-elected.
| nowrap | 

|-
! 
| colspan=3 | None (District created)
|  | New seat.New member elected.Democratic gain.
| nowrap | 

|}

Utah 

|-
! 
| Laurence J. Burton
|  | Republican
| 1962
| Incumbent re-elected.
| nowrap | 

|-
! 
| David S. King
|  | Democratic
| 1964
|  | Incumbent lost re-election.New member elected.Republican gain.
| nowrap | 

|}

Vermont 

|-
! 
| Robert Stafford
|  | Republican
| 1960
| Incumbent re-elected.
| nowrap | 

|}

Virginia 

|-
! 
| Thomas N. Downing
|  | Democratic
| 1958
| Incumbent re-elected.
| nowrap | 

|-
! 
| Porter Hardy Jr.
|  | Democratic
| 1946
| Incumbent re-elected.
| nowrap | 

|-
! 
| David E. Satterfield III
|  | Democratic
| 1964
| Incumbent re-elected.
| nowrap | 

|-
! 
| Watkins Moorman Abbitt
|  | Democratic
| 1948
| Incumbent re-elected.
| nowrap | 

|-
! 
| William M. Tuck
|  | Democratic
| 1953 
| Incumbent re-elected.
| nowrap | 

|-
! 
| Richard Harding Poff
|  | Republican
| 1952
| Incumbent re-elected.
| nowrap | 

|-
! 
| John Otho Marsh Jr.
|  | Democratic
| 1962
| Incumbent re-elected.
| nowrap | 

|-
! 
| Howard W. Smith
|  | Democratic
| 1930
|  | Incumbent lost renomination.New member elected.Republican gain.
| nowrap | 

|-
! 
| W. Pat Jennings
|  | Democratic
| 1954
|  | Incumbent lost re-election.New member elected.Republican gain.
| nowrap | 

|-
! 
| Joel Broyhill
|  | Republican
| 1952
| Incumbent re-elected.
| nowrap | 

|}

Washington 

|-
! 
| Thomas Pelly
|  | Republican
| 1952
| Incumbent re-elected.
| nowrap | 

|-
! 
| Lloyd Meeds
|  | Democratic
| 1964
| Incumbent re-elected.
| nowrap | 

|-
! 
| Julia Butler Hansen
|  | Democratic
| 1960
| Incumbent re-elected.
| nowrap | 

|-
! 
| Catherine Dean May
|  | Republican
| 1958
| Incumbent re-elected.
| nowrap | 

|-
! 
| Tom Foley
|  | Democratic
| 1964
| Incumbent re-elected.
| nowrap | 

|-
! 
| Floyd Hicks
|  | Democratic
| 1964
| Incumbent re-elected.
| nowrap | 

|-
! 
| Brock Adams
|  | Democratic
| 1964
| Incumbent re-elected.
| nowrap | 

|}

West Virginia 

|-
! 
| Arch A. Moore Jr.
|  | Republican
| 1956
| Incumbent re-elected.
| nowrap | 

|-
! 
| Harley Orrin Staggers
|  | Democratic
| 1948
| Incumbent re-elected.
| nowrap | 

|-
! 
| John M. Slack Jr.
|  | Democratic
| 1958
| Incumbent re-elected.
| nowrap | 

|-
! 
| Ken Hechler
|  | Democratic
| 1958
| Incumbent re-elected.
| nowrap | 

|-
! 
| James Kee
|  | Democratic
| 1964
| Incumbent re-elected.
| nowrap | 

|}

Wisconsin 

|-
! 
| Lynn E. Stalbaum
|  | Democratic
| 1964
|  | Incumbent lost re-election.New member elected.Republican gain.
| nowrap | 

|-
! 
| Robert Kastenmeier
|  | Democratic
| 1958
| Incumbent re-elected.
| nowrap | 

|-
! 
| Vernon Wallace Thomson
|  | Republican
| 1960
| Incumbent re-elected.
| nowrap | 

|-
! 
| Clement J. Zablocki
|  | Democratic
| 1948
| Incumbent re-elected.
| nowrap | 

|-
! 
| Henry S. Reuss
|  | Democratic
| 1954
| Incumbent re-elected.
| nowrap | 

|-
! 
| John Abner Race
|  | Democratic
| 1964
|  | Incumbent lost re-election.New member elected.Republican gain.
| nowrap | 

|-
! 
| Melvin Laird
|  | Republican
| 1952
| Incumbent re-elected.
| nowrap | 

|-
! 
| John W. Byrnes
|  | Republican
| 1944
| Incumbent re-elected.
| nowrap | 

|-
! 
| Glenn Robert Davis
|  | Republican
| 1947 1956 1964
| Incumbent re-elected.
| nowrap | 

|-
! 
| Alvin O'Konski
|  | Republican
| 1942
| Incumbent re-elected.
| nowrap | 

|}

Wyoming 

|-
! 
| Teno Roncalio
|  | Democratic
| 1964
|  | Incumbent retired to run for U.S. Senator.New member elected.Republican gain.
| nowrap | 

|}

See also
 1966 United States elections
 1966 United States gubernatorial elections
 1966 United States Senate elections
 89th United States Congress
 90th United States Congress

References

Further reading
 "1966 Elections–A Major Republican Comeback." in CQ Almanac 1966 (22nd ed., 1967) pp 1387–88. online
 , plus articles on the other western states in the same issue
 
 , Focus on 1966
 
 McLay, Mark. "A High-Wire Crusade: Republicans and the War on Poverty, 1966." Journal of Policy History 31.3 (2019): 382–405.